Grevillea fulgens is a species of flowering plant in the family Proteaceae and is endemic to an area near Ravensthorpe in the south-west of Western Australia. It is a spreading to straggling shrub with simple or pinnatifid leaves, and deep pink or reddish flowers.

Description
Grevillea fulgens is a spreading to straggling shrub that typically grows to a height of  but does not form a lignotuber. The edges of the leaves are rolled under, obscuring most of the lower surface.

Taxonomy
Grevillea fulgens was first formally described in 1964 by Charles Gardner in the Journal of the Royal Society of Western Australia. The specific epithet (fulgens) means "shining".

Distribution and habitat
Grevillea fulgens grows in shrubland or mallee heath in shallow gravelly soil on laterite, and is found in an area near Ravensthorpe in the Esperance Plains bioregion of south-western Western Australia. It is known to be a disturbance opportunist in the gravel soils of the Ravensthorpe Range.

Conservation status
Grevillea fulgens is classified as "Priority Three" by the Government of Western Australia Department of Biodiversity, Conservation and Attractions, meaning that it is poorly known and known from only a few locations but is not under imminent threat.

See also
 List of Grevillea species

References

fulgens
Proteales of Australia
Eudicots of Western Australia
Plants described in 1964
Taxa named by Charles Gardner